Rubaruba (tuRubaruba) is a Kainji language of Nigeria belonging to the Kamuku language complex. Rubaruba is reported by Blench (2012), but is not covered in Ethnologue or Glottolog.

References

Kamuku languages
Languages of Nigeria